Joseph Pathrapankal (29 September 1930 – 27 February 2022) was an Indian New Testament Scholar and Syro-Malabar priest belonging to the Carmelites of Mary Immaculate.

He first studied at the Jnana-Deepa Vidyapeeth in Pune and then went to the Pontifical Biblical Institute where he obtained a Licentiate in Sacred Scripture in 1960.  He then became a Lecturer then Professor of New Testament, and from 1976 to 1979 and 1979 to 1985 the Vice-President and President at Dharmārām Vidya Kshetram (DVK), Bengaluru.<ref>John C. England, Asian Christian Theologies: Asia region, 7th-20th centuries ; South Asia ; Austral Asia Volume 1 of Asian Christian Theologies: A Research Guide to Authors, Movements, Sources, ISPCK, New Delhi, 2004.  p. 285.  </ref> On May 30, 1997
Pathrapankal received an honorary doctorate from the Faculty of Theology  at Uppsala University, Sweden.

Pathrapankal was also a member of the Pontifical Biblical Commission.Booktopia

He was a former past President of the Society for Biblical Studies in India, and a member of the Studiorum Novi Testamenti Societas.

Writings
 Time and History: Biblical and Theological Studies

Pathrapankal again left for Rome on study leave and registered as a doctoral candidate with the Gregorian University and pursued research in New Testament studies and submitted a thesis titled Metanoia, Faith, Covenant: A Study of Pauline Theology'' which was later published by Dharmārām Vidya Kshetram in 1971.  Pathrapankal returned to India and continued teaching at Dharmārām Vidya Kshetram.

References
Notes

1930 births
2022 deaths
People from Kerala
Indian biblical scholars
Indian Christian theologians
Syro-Malabar priests
Carmelite Order
Pontifical Gregorian University alumni
Pontifical Biblical Institute alumni
Academic staff of the Senate of Serampore College (University)